Mangalore City North Assembly constituency (Previously Surathkal) is one of the Karnataka Legislative Assemblies or Vidhan Sabha constituencies in Karnataka. Mangalore City-North is part of Dakshina Kannada Lok Sabha constituency along with seven other Vidhan Sabha segments, namely: 201. Moodabidri, 203. Mangalore City South, 204. Mangalore, 205. Bantwal, 206. Puttur and 207. Sullia.

History 
During the 2007 delimitation exercise conducted by Election Commission of India several villages in Moodbidri constituency were included in Surathkal constituency and renamed as Mangalore City North constituency. Until 2008 C.E. Mangalore City -North legislative assembly constituency was known as Surathkal assembly constituency. Surathkal legislative assembly segment was part of Udupi (Lok Sabha constituency) up to 2008. It was renamed as Mangalore City North in Karnataka Legislative Assembly Elections 2008 and became part of Dakshina Kannada (Lok Sabha constituency) during Lok Sabha Elections 2009.

Members of Legislative Assembly

Election results

2018 
There were 7 contestants including 1 independent contestant in 2018 election.

2013 
There were 9 contestants including 3 independent contestants in 2013 election.

2008 
There were 6 contestants including 1 independent contestant in 2008 election.

See also 
 Mangalore Assembly constituency
 Mangalore City South

References 

 

Assembly constituencies of Karnataka
Geography of Mangalore
Mangalore
Cities and towns in Dakshina Kannada district
Dakshina Kannada district